Love Tie or Time Before Military Service Day is a 1963 South Vietnamese 35mm black-and-white film directed by Lê Mộng Hoàng.

Plot
A love story of Dũng, a playboy from the National Conservatory of Music and Lệ Trinh, a cabaret songstress.

Production
Location is Saigon in 1963 while before the 1 November coup.

Art
 Type: Romance, feature.
 Studio: Mỹ Vân Films
 Print: National Cinema Centre
 Directors: Lê Mộng Hoàng
 Screenplay: Nguyễn Thành Châu
 Composer: Phạm Duy
 Theme songs by Hoàng Thi Thơ (with Tình đêm liên hoan), Nguyễn Hiền (w. Đường tơ thôi lưu luyến), Văn Phụng (w. Tôi đi giữa hoàng hôn), Trúc Phương (w. Tơ vương & Chuyện chúng mình) and Phạm Duy (w. Tơ tình).

Cast

 Thẩm Thúy Hằng as Lệ Trinh
 Mai Ly as Thu Hà
 La Thoại Tân as Trần Anh Dũng
 Tâm Đan as Hồng Liên
 Thanh Thúy as Herself as cabaret singer
 Bảy Nhiêu as Trần Anh Kiệt
 Hữu Phước as Biết
 Lê Thương as Mr. Công
 Hoàng Mai as Lâm
 Năm Châu

with musicians and dancers of the Vietnam Artists Association (Đoàn Văn nghệ Việt Nam).

References

 Lê Quang Thanh Tâm, Pre-1975 South Vietnamese Cinema, Ho Chi Minh City Culture and Art Publishing House, 2015.
 Sovereignty, Surveillance and Spectacle in The Saigon Fabulous Four

Vietnamese romance films
Vietnamese musical films
Films based on works by Vietnamese writers
1963 films